The Little Prince is a 1974 British-American sci-fi fantasy-musical film with screenplay and lyrics by Alan Jay Lerner, music by Frederick Loewe, arranged and orchestrated by Angela Morley. It was both directed and produced by Stanley Donen and based on the 1943 classic children-adult's novella, The Little Prince (Le Petit Prince), by the writer, poet and aviator Count Antoine de Saint-Exupéry, who disappeared near the end of the Second World War some 15 months after his fable was first published.

The film and its music were unsuccessful at the box office but became somewhat popular after its theatrical run, and has been released for sale on various media.

Background 
The original Little Prince was first published in 1943, and is the most famous work of the French aristocrat, writer, poet and pioneering aviator Count Antoine de Saint-Exupéry (1900–1944). It is a poetic tale self-illustrated in watercolours in which a pilot stranded in the desert meets a young prince fallen to Earth from a tiny asteroid. The story is philosophical and includes societal criticism, remarking on the strangeness of the adult world.

Antoine de Saint-Exupéry wrote and illustrated The Little Prince in New York City and Asharoken, N.Y. in mid-to-late 1942 while exiled in the United States after the Fall of France, with the manuscript being completed in October. It would be first published in early 1943 in both English and French, but only in the U.S. It would later appear in his native homeland of France posthumously, after the liberation of Paris, as all of Saint-Exupéry's works had been banned in Nazi-occupied France. Since first being published the novella has been adapted to various media over the decades, including audio recordings, stage, ballet, and operatic works.

The fantasy-musical film adaptation of The Little Prince was directed and produced by Stanley Donen, and stars Steven Warner in the title role, with Richard Kiley as the aviator, titled as The Pilot. Additional cast members included Bob Fosse as The Snake, Gene Wilder as The Fox, Donna McKechnie as the petulant, vain Rose, Joss Ackland as The King, and Victor Spinetti as The Historian. The film's desert sequences were shot on location in Tunisia.

The production was Lerner and Loewe's final musical. The music's creative team were dissatisfied with the film's Hollywood treatment, with Loewe refusing to visit London to supervise the arrangement and recording of the score.

Plot 
Based in the 1943 classic book of the same name by Antoine de Saint-Exupéry, the fable tells the story of an aviator forced to make an emergency landing in the Sahara Desert. There he is befriended by a young boy, the Little Prince, who had descended to Earth from Asteroid B-612. In the days that follow, The Pilot hears about his past and various journeys throughout the Solar System.

As he travels through space, the Little Prince encounters several strange grown-ups on different planetoids, all with a skewed or curious way of looking at life. But it is not until he finally reaches Earth, that the Little Prince learns his most important life lessons of all, mainly from The Fox, and The Snake. Before the Little Prince dies, he shares those lessons with The Pilot. Although The Pilot tries to keep the Little Prince alive, the boy disappears in the morning and The Pilot searches for him in the desert but gives up after realizing that the Little Prince never existed. Soon The Pilot is able to start his plane and flies away but hears the laughter of the Little Prince in the starry night; he believes the boy has returned to space.

Cast 
 Steven Warner as The Little Prince
 Richard Kiley as The Pilot
 Bob Fosse as The Snake
 Gene Wilder as The Fox
 Donna McKechnie as The Rose
 Joss Ackland as The King
 Graham Crowden as The General
 Victor Spinetti as The Historian
 Clive Revill as The Businessman

Richard Burton was actively pursued for the role of The Pilot. Burton had had a huge success on Broadway with Lerner and Loewe's musical production Camelot, but turned down the role in The Little Prince.

Musical numbers 

 Overture - Orchestra
"It's a Hat/I Need Air" - Chorus/The Pilot
 "I'm on Your Side" - The Pilot
"Be Happy" - The Rose
 "You're a Child, Pt. 1" - The King
"You're a Child, Pt. 2" - The Businessman
 "I Never Met a Rose" - The Pilot
 "Why Is the Desert" - The Pilot and The Little Prince
 "A Snake in the Grass" - The Snake
 "Closer and Closer and Closer" - The Fox and The Little Prince
 "Little Prince" - The Pilot
 "Finale: Little Prince" - Chorus

Production 
The film was shot on location in Tunisia.

In 1973, Lerner and Loewe recorded the score at the Palm Springs Desert Museum, with Lerner on vocals and Loewe at the piano. It included "Matters of Consequence", which was cut from the film. It is one of only a few existing recordings of the duo performing together.

The film had production design by John Barry (not to be confused with composer John Barry, who later composed a musical adaptation of The Little Prince for Broadway).

Soundtrack 
A soundtrack album was released by ABC Records. It is now available in CD format on the Decca Records label.

Release
The film opened at Radio City Music Hall in New York City on November 7, 1974 in a show including The Nativity, The Rockettes and the Will Irwin Orchestra and grossed $215,000 in its opening week.

Legacy
Bob Fosse appears in the film as The Snake for one song, "A Snake in the Grass", during which he does a dance sequence that he choreographed, which includes trademark Fosse elements such as hip thrusts, jazz hands and use of hat and jacket as props. This scene in the film has been speculated to have been a major influence on singer Michael Jackson's costume and choreography for performances of his 1982 hit song "Billie Jean". Fosse's dance sequence even included a variation on the moonwalk, a dance step that Jackson included in his "Billie Jean" performances that later became his signature move.

See also

 List of American films of 1974

References 
 Citations 

 Bibliography 

 Schiff, Stacy (1994) Saint-Exupéry: A Biography, (1994) Pimlico; (1996) Da Capo; (2006) Henry Holt,

External links 
 
 
 
 
 Lerner and Loewe recording

1974 films
1970s musical fantasy films
1970s science fiction films
American aviation films
American children's fantasy films
American musical fantasy films
American science fantasy films
American science fiction films
British aviation films
British children's fantasy films
British musical fantasy films
British science fiction films
1970s English-language films
Films about children
Films about princes
Films based on French novels
Films directed by Stanley Donen
Films scored by Frederick Loewe
Films set in Africa
Films shot in Tunisia
Films shot at EMI-Elstree Studios
Films with screenplays by Alan Jay Lerner
Paramount Pictures films
Works based on The Little Prince
1970s children's fantasy films
1970s dance films
1970s American films
1970s British films